Linda Charlotte Aslaksen, also known as Zina, (born 1986) is a Sámi artist and educator from Porsgrunn in the south of Norway. After spending several years in Shoreditch, London, where she gained fame as a street artist, in 2018 she returned to Norway to teach at the art school in Karasjok.

Biography
Born in Porsgrunn in the south of Norway, Linda Charlotte Aslaksen is the daughter of parents from Karasjok in the far north. She is a graduate in illustration and graphic design from University College Falmouth. From 2010, Aslaksen spent several years in London where, thanks to friends who demonstrated the technique, she became a street artist based in Shoreditch. Recognition was triggered by a painting of a muscle man for a training centre in February 2014. It was to be the first of many more, allowing her to make a living as a full-time artist. Her predominantly blue works often depict women and children. She became even more successful after receiving a contract from Beefeater Gin.
Huffington Post referred to her as one of the world's 25 most notable female street artists.

In August 2016, after nine years in London, she moved back to Norway, settling in Alta, Finnmark. There she caused something of a commotion after painting the walls of the young people's school. Later she attracted attention from far and wide in nearby Sørvær by creating a portrait of a traditional fisherman wearing earphones headed "Sørøy Rocken" on the wall of a fish factory. "There's no doubt who should be this year's artist at the Sørøyrocken Festival," commented its cultural expert Ken Arne Brox.

In 2018, Aslaksen was given an appointment as a teacher at the art school in Karasjok, not far from Alta where she lives. She also collaborates with Alta's Sisa Cultural Centre, participating in workshops in the local schools.

References

External links
Examples of Linda Aslaksen's artwork from Infinity Dimension Art Gallery 
Zina on Saatchi Art

1986 births
People from Porsgrunn
Sámi artists
Norwegian Sámi people
Street artists
Norwegian women artists
Norwegian educators
Women educators
Living people